The Mass Transit incident was a professional wrestling event that took place during an Extreme Championship Wrestling (ECW) house show on November 23, 1996, at the Wonderland Ballroom in Revere, Massachusetts. 17-year-old Erich Kulas, an aspiring professional wrestler who used the ring name "Mass Transit," was seriously injured in a tag-team match against The Gangstas; the most severe injury occurred when Kulas was bladed too deeply by Jerome "New Jack" Young, severing two of his arteries. Further controversy arose when it came to light that Kulas had lied to ECW owner and booker Paul Heyman about his age and professional wrestling training.

The incident led to the temporary cancellation of the inaugural ECW pay-per-view Barely Legal and legal action against Young. Due to Kulas's deception, however, Barely Legal was reinstated and the legal action ended in Young's favor.

Match
Axl Rotten had been scheduled to work a tag-team match with D-Von Dudley against The Gangstas (New Jack and Mustafa Saed), but could not make the show due to a family emergency. The show was also scheduled to feature dwarf wrestlers Tiny the Terrible and Half Nelson against 17-year-old Erich Kulas, who performed as Mass Transit, a Ralph Kramden-esque bus driver. Kulas convinced ECW owner and booker Paul Heyman to have him fill in for Rotten by claiming he was 21 and had wrestled for Killer Kowalski, a retired star wrestler who ran a notable wrestling school in the Boston area. Heyman said later he did not know Kulas' age. 

Before the match, Kulas asked New Jack to blade him since he never had done it himself and New Jack agreed. During the match, Dudley and New Jack brawled outside the ring, while Saed and Transit fought inside the ring. The match was booked as a squash, with Dudley quickly isolated outside the ring and told not to return by the Gangstas. The Gangstas then double-teamed Kulas inside the ring, with New Jack pummeling him with crutches, toasters, and various other objects in the hardcore style ECW was known for. At the end of the match, New Jack bladed Kulas with a surgical scalpel, as the two had agreed, but cut too deeply and severed two arteries in Kulas' forehead. He screamed in pain, then passed out as blood poured from his head.

The event was a house show and thus not televised, but fan camcorders caught footage which was eventually used as evidence in legal proceedings. The video showed New Jack quietly asking Kulas, after the blading, "You all right?" Next, The Gangstas proceeded to work Kulas over even more with elbow drops and various objects, prompting Kulas' father to scream, "Ring the fucking bell. He's 17!" As medics rushed into the ring to aid Kulas, New Jack grabbed the house microphone, and in an attempt to garner heat, he shouted, "I don't care if the motherfucker dies! He's white. I don't like white people. I don't like people from Boston. I'm the wrong nigga to fuck with."

According to New Jack in an interview with RF Video, he told Kulas, "This is not a good idea," prior to the match.

Repercussions

Pay-per-view cancellation
The incident led to the cancellation of ECW's first ever pay-per-view (PPV) event, Barely Legal, by pay-per-view provider Request TV on Christmas Eve, 1996. Heyman, by his own admission in The Rise and Fall of ECW, "begged and pleaded" with Request and finally convinced the company they had been misled. The PPV event was placed back on the schedule on Sunday, April 13, 1997, at 9:00 PM.

Inside Edition interview
Kulas and his family later did an interview with Inside Edition that featured footage from the incident, including New Jack cutting him and berating him after the match. The segment depicted Kulas as an innocent, unprepared victim while vilifying ECW, even going as far as showing that Heyman had not asked for any state identification. The story was completed before the Kulases launched their lawsuit, so the key details of how Kulas actually got himself into the match had not been made public at that point.

Legal action
Three years after the incident, Jack was tried on charges of assault and battery with a dangerous weapon, and was later sued by the Kulas family. After hearing Kulas asked to be cut, a jury acquitted him, and he was later found not liable in civil court. Wrestlers testified that Kulas was extremely arrogant and demanding backstage prior to the match and, when told that he would have to bleed as part of the match, Kulas had asked Young to blade him, since he had never done it. The court also heard his father shouted "He's only 17!" and "Take it easy on him, he's just a kid!" when they isolated his son from D-Von Dudley during the match and double-teamed him.

The book The Rise and Fall of ECW also states that as the medic crew carried Kulas out, he was escorted by Tommy Dreamer, who held his hand to comfort him. Passing by the audience, Kulas began giving them the finger in an attempt to continue "playing the bad guy".

Authorities later determined that Kulas had lied to Heyman about his age and experience; Kulas claimed to be 21 years of age, but he was actually 17 years old. He also claimed to have been trained by Killer Kowalski, and his father vouched for him, but Kulas was never trained to wrestle. In The Rise and Fall of ECW, Heyman says Kulas' dubious credentials as a student of Killer Kowalski were endorsed by Tiny the Terrible.

Later events
Erich Kulas died on May 12, 2002, at the age of 22, due to complications from gastric bypass surgery.

The incident was featured in a 2020 episode of Dark Side of the Ring centered on New Jack. Kulas' family declined to participate in the episode.

Up to his own death in May 2021, New Jack did not express remorse for the incident; his final tweet on his Twitter account reiterated Kulas requested the blading.

See also
 Chuck Austin

References

External links
2004 interview with wrestler New Jack

Extreme Championship Wrestling
Revere, Massachusetts
Events in Suffolk County, Massachusetts
1996 in professional wrestling
Professional wrestling controversies
1996 in Massachusetts
Professional wrestling matches
Professional wrestling in Massachusetts
November 1996 events in the United States